Tsietsi Daniel Motijoane, better known as Nana Coyote, was a Lesotho born South African musician. Motijoane grew up in Sharpeville, in what is known as the Vaal Triangle.  He started singing at an early age and had formed a band by the time he was in high school. 

One of his early recordings was an album titled Current in 1986 which had hit songs such as Current Uyayinova and Don't You Wanna Know Me, The following year (1987) released Who's Lord In The House, Save The World (1988) which was followed by Vuku Zenzele (1989)  He performed and featured in album recordings, mostly as a featured artist with groups like Stimela and Sankomota, Started out at a local band called The Black Five in Sharpeville in 1975 where he was the lead singer, Throughout his career he worked with a number of bands, at times as a featured artist, and in some cases as a band member.
 
Coyote released his solo album titled “Majaja”  on the 1st of August 2003.  In 2004, Nana Coyote, Steve Kekana and Joe Nina recorded a studio album as The Trio titled "My Pride, My Joy".  The album also featured Tshepo Tshola and Hugh Masekela.

He also lent his voice to a number of musical projects, including "Party Time" by Moses Khumalo in 2005 and "Ke Nako" by Nutty Nys.
 
Nana Coyote died in 2010 after illness.  He was posthumously honoured with a SAMA Lifetime Achievement Award in 2016 at the South African Music Awards.

Awards and honours

Discography

Albums

Compilations

Singles and EPs

As Part of Band

As Featured Artist

References

External links 
 Nana Coyote on Apple Music
 3 SA music icons honoured with Lifetime Achievement Awards
 Here are all the 2016 Sama winners
 The Full List of Winners at the 2016 South African Music Awards #SAMA22
 SAMA 22 to honour Coyote, Bhekumuzi and Roger Lucey
 Nana Coyote dies
 SOUTH AFRICAN MUSIC
 Nana Coyote: the giant has fallen

2010 deaths
1955 births
20th-century Lesotho male singers
21st-century Lesotho male singers